Alfred Stefani (August 28, 1926 – October 2, 1992) was a Canadian rower. He competed in the men's eight event at the 1948 Summer Olympics.

References

External links
 
 

1926 births
1992 deaths
Canadian male rowers
Olympic rowers of Canada
Rowers at the 1948 Summer Olympics
Place of birth missing